Stumm is a municipality in the Schwaz district in the Austrian state of Tyrol.

Geography
Stumm lies in the central Ziller valley on the right bank of the Ziller.

Gallery

References

External links

Cities and towns in Schwaz District